Actebia squalida is a moth of the family Noctuidae. It known from Finland, the southern Urals, and eastern Siberia.

It was previously thought to also occur in North America but this error comes from a misidentification of Actebia balanitis.

The larvae probably feed on various grasses.

References

Noctuinae
Moths of Asia
Moths of Europe
Moths described in 1852